The 1970 California Secretary of State election was held on November 3, 1970. Democratic nominee Jerry Brown narrowly defeated Republican nominee James L. Flournoy with 50.41% of the vote.

Primary elections
Primary elections were held on June 2, 1970.

Democratic primary

Candidates
Jerry Brown, member of the Los Angeles Community College District Board of Trustees 
Hugh M. Burns, State Senator
Jimmy Campbell

Results

Republican primary

Candidates
James L. Flournoy, attorney
George W. Milias, State Assemblyman
Alberta Jordan
J. C. Chambers
John E. "Jack" Leadbetter
Wendell T. Handy
Kim Harris Pearman

Results

General election

Candidates
Major party candidates
Jerry Brown, Democratic
James L. Flournoy, Republican

Other candidates
Thomas M. Goodloe Jr., American Independent
Israel Feuer, Peace and Freedom

Results

References

1970
Secretary of State
1970 United States state secretary of state elections